Stoney Burke (born January 17, 1953) is an American street performer and actor based in California.

Bio
Burke was born in Highland, Michigan, to a home he describes as "unstable." He was adopted at the age of 3 and grew up north of Detroit in the village of Romeo with parents who were active in the civil rights movement. He took the name "Stoney" from the 1962–63 TV series about rodeo rider Stoney Burke, portrayed by Jack Lord.

Performing career
In 1975, Burke moved to Eugene, Oregon and enrolled as a dance and theater major at the University of Oregon. He moved to the San Francisco Bay area in 1977 to study mime with Leonard Pitt, and soon began performing and commenting on current events. He claims to have "been hassled or arrested so many times practicing my free speech, I would bore you with the truth of it all."

Burke performs political comedy on college campuses, most notably at the University of California, Berkeley near Sather Gate. Burke routinely engages crowds throughout the day using conservative Republican perspectives as his primary satire subject matter. Burke hosts a TV show called Stoney Speaks on public-access television cable TV. Burke was featured in a Swedish documentary called An American in America. He played a soup kitchen server in the 2001 movie Bartleby and played a truck driver in the 2003 movie The Matrix Reloaded.  He had a major role playing Lockheed Martin in Craig Baldwin's Mock Up on Mu.

The San Francisco Board of Supervisors in November 2006, passed a resolution that declared November 14, 2007 "Stoney, A Clown Who Rabble Rouses In Defense of Free Speech, Day".

The University of California, Berkeley sailing team hosts an annual college sailing regatta named in Burke's honor.

Burke has a B.A. from San Francisco State University.

See also
Swami X

References

External links

Stoney Speaks

American street performers
American male comedians
21st-century American comedians
Living people
People from the San Francisco Bay Area
University of California, Berkeley people
San Francisco State University alumni
People from Highland, Oakland County, Michigan
Male actors from Eugene, Oregon
1953 births